HD 12661 b is a giant exoplanet two and a half times the mass of Jupiter orbiting around the star HD 12661.

References

Aries (constellation)
Giant planets
Exoplanets discovered in 2001
Exoplanets detected by radial velocity